Smyth M. Miles served in the California legislature and during both the Mexican–American War and the American Civil War he served in the US Army.

References

American military personnel of the Mexican–American War
Union Army personnel
Members of the California State Legislature
Year of birth missing
Year of death missing